Donald L. Alder, or Don Alder, (born in Vancouver, BC, Canada) is a Canadian fingerstyle guitarist, singer, songwriter, composer, and speaker.

Biography 

He spent his early childhood years in Montreal, before his family moved to Williams Lake, British Columbia. He has played guitar since age 11.
In March 1985, Alder put his music career on hold to accompany his friend Rick Hansen on his Man in Motion world tour.
In January 1988, Mayor Woods of Williams Lake presented a certificate of merit to Don Alder for "Disabled Awareness - Man in Motion".

Don Alder's character appears in the feature film "Heart of a Dragon" (2008), a movie about the Man In Motion Tour, with Andrew Lee Potts playing the character of "Don". Don Alder also worked on this movie as a technical advisor.

Alder is also featured in a play called "Rick: The Rick Hansen Story", which is also about the Man in Motion Tour.

Don Alder was a member of the Canadian National Paralympic team in Atlanta for the 1996 Games and again in 2000 for the Games in Sydney, Australia. Alder did not participate as an athlete but as the equipment manager and wheelchair technician.

In 2007, Don Alder became International Fingerstyle Champion.
In 2010, he was the Guitar Superstar contest winner.
In 2011, he won the World Wide Guitar Idol contest.
In 2013, he won Brand Laureate Award (Malaysia) for his contributions using his guitar and music to help and inspire others around the world.
In 2015, he was awarded the "Domenic Troiano Guitar Award" in the category "multi-genre".
Today, Alder continues to play to Canadian, American, European, and Asian audiences.
In 2016, he was nominated for a Canadian Folk Music Award and a Western Canadian Music Award.
In 2017, he won "Artist of the Year" at the Vancouver Island Music Awards.
In 2021, the BC Entertainment Hall of Fame honored Don Alder with a Star Meritus status.
Alder has performed at venues around the world, including Muriel Anderson's All Star Guitar Night which he performed at five times.
He writes and performs all of his own music, and has released seven albums. His CD, Not a Planet earned him a nomination for Instrumental Solo Artist of the Year at the Canadian Folk Music Awards in 2009.

Greenfield Guitars designed a signature guitar for Don Alder, known as the G4-Don Alder model, which is a G4 married with a Novax Fanned Fret fingerboard.

In August 2016, Don Alder signed on with the Fret Monkey Record Label.

Don Alder has written for iGuitar magazine.

Don Alder performed with Keith Knight as "Extreme Guitar Duo".

He was a featured guest on CBC's "North by Northwest" (nxnw) in 2011.

Don Alder has performed at TEDxVancouver and was also a finalist on Canada's Got Talent.

The University of British Columbia has listed Don Alder as a featured presenter.

Don Alder has done volunteer work for the Vancouver Adapted Music Society.

Don Alder also volunteered as "Artist as teachers" for DAREarts, a Canadian charitable organization that uses educational experiences in the arts to empower children and youth facing life challenges, with confidence, courage, and leadership skills to unlock their potential and ignite change in their lives and communities.

He is also a featured performer for Synergy Collective.

Don Alder has many endorsements, including Seymour Duncan, Laney Amplification, Yamaha Guitars, Riversong Guitars,  Santo Angelo Cables, Tonewood Amps, Journey Guitars, Leviora Guitars, Guitar Hands, Ernie Ball, and Dyer Harp Guitars.

In fall 2014, Riversong Guitars, Kamloops, BC, Canada built a "Don Alder Signature Baritone", featuring many design innovations, including a new bracing system, bridge design and a new electronics package (Slap). This new guitar was presented to the public at NAMM 2015 in Anaheim, California.

In April 2014, Don Alder performed the song "Space Oddity" together with Canadian astronaut and ISS Space Station Commander Chris Hadfield. The third Canadian on stage at this event, which took place in Kona, Hawaii, was actor William Shatner.

Discography 
2015 Armed and Dangerous;
2008 Not A Planet;
2007 Acoustic Matters;
2005 Take The Train, eh;
2005 Cool Tunes Compilation;
2005 Best of Don Alder;
2003 Acoustiholic;

2015 Armed & Dangerous:
"Don't let the cover art of Don Alder's Armed & Dangerous CD throw you. It pays homage to the cast of The Walking Dead TV series and features a trench-coated zombie slayer armed with a fan fret acoustic guitar equipped with an optional head stock blade, body blade, variable angle chainsaw and a flame thrower whammy bar. Scary as that might be, musically there is nothing dead about this vibrant collection of 12 original compositions. In fact, the only scary thing here is that Alder's infectious fretwork will leave an indelible imprint in your musical memory. The highly accoladed Alder has attained more fret-cred than, perhaps any other fingerstylist over the past eight or nine years, yet there is no sense that he has any intention of resting on his laurels if this often energetic and engaging CD is any indication. Much like his last release, Not a Planet, Alder offers a variety of sonic flavors and styles with technique and execution that are precise and so very fluid. There is an improvisational feel to the performances on Armed & Dangerous that create an immediacy that is fast becoming an Alder trademark. "Going Rogue" opens the CD with a deceptively intricate and eloquent intro before sliding, literally and sonically, head long in a tasty, yet funky grove that burst continually in unexpected melodic directions - as if the fret board of Alder's baritone guitar was a roller coaster and his fingers were alternately delighted, thrilled and hanging on for dear life. Before you have time to recover from the opening track, Alder lets loose "Love & Life," perhaps the most beautiful and satisfying vocal tunes he has ever penned, complete with full band accompaniment and violins that heighten the melody and Alder's spot-on vocals. If I weren't for the phenomenal guitar work throughout this album, "Love & Life," would be my favorite track. As he has proven before, the man can flat-out sing! "Dancing with Spin Doctors," adds a whole new aspect to Alder's repertoire. He lays down an electric finger-style groove with help from Billy Sheehan on bass and Sam Cartwright on drums that has Eric Johnson-esque overtones and feels completely at home nestled in amongst the acoustic bulk of this collection. For sheer beauty, both "Sophrosyne" and "Precious Moments" show the delicate side of Alder's fretwork as he coaxes sweetness from a baritone guitar that I haven't heard since Pat Metheny's One Quiet Night. Other highlights include "Circuitous," a fingerstyle gem and the spirited "Three Good Reasons To Play," a duet written and with Luca Francioso. Not surprisingly, the release of Armed & Dangerous coincides with Don Alder's name appearing on the cover of Guitar Player Magazine. Go figure..." James Filkins

2008 Not a Planet:
"Acoustic fingerstyle soloist Don Alder branches out to sit in with a number of players on nine of the 13 tunes on this recording. The 2007 Winfield International Guitar Fingerstyle Champion even sings on two tracks. (He sings well enough to front a band.) Collaborations like "The Wall" yield a polished, rootsy pop. The ambient textures of "Sayonara.calm," a duet with Michael Manring, border on a new age vocabulary. The solo "He Said, She Said" puts the melody right out front of a shuffle. The track reveals Alder's remarkable fluidity and ability to make clear statements. "Taiwan Traffic Jam" cuts out in a Willy Porter vein, with a driving urgency that showcases pure chops rooted in a strong, chiming melody. Overall, Alder proves he plays well with others on this outing. The emotional content is amorphous, yet specific to the moment at hand. At times you can feel an almost cinematic sensibility behind it."  Steve Klingaman

2007 Acoustic Matters:
"Acoustic Matters is a collection of interesting and sometimes fun pieces showing off Alder's abilities. There are 10 tunes with comical titles listed on the album's cover art. Alder's album is appropriately titled since every track is only the man and his acoustic guitar."

2005 Take the Train, eh:
"Canada is one of the places where many finger-style guitarists have their residence. Don Alder lives in Vancouver and has been a guitarist/ composer for over 23 years. He performed with Don Ross, Alex de Grassi, Peppino D'Agostino among others. Also, Don was a competitor in the prestigious U.S. National Finger-style Guitar Championship in Winfield, Kansas. Don Alder's influences come from guitar players like Michael Hedges, Don Ross and for instance Bruce Cockburn. His new album Take the Train Eh. is a groovy and up tempo album with extraordinary techniques on his selected guitars. He uses Greenfield, Lowden and Jenkins guitars, which all have their own unique sound. This album is a solo guitar album without Don's warm expressive voice. Don starts off with Dr. Dr. which is full of astonishing techniques as tapping, slapping, percussion and a brilliant groove. Meeting Pierre is in the style of Pierre Bensusan, who also as Don plays a lot in DADGAD tuning. This song embodies a lot of space and structure with a fine gentle touch. The album would even impress more if Don focused more on melody line building and not primarily on skilled techniques. Chet or Cheese shows his admiration for Chet Atkins in a top-notch composition. One of my favorites is Its Only Goodbye which has all a good song needs, balance, structure and emotion. Tommy Time is an ode to Tommy Emmanuel with the typical melody lines and staccato approach. One thing is clear Don Alder has an own significant signature which covers all capabilities in finger-style music. Don Alder writes all his songs himself which can compete with the best guitarists in the circuit. Seldom one sees so much quality and versatility in one guitarist. Don Alder succeeds with this album to impress any serious acoustic guitarist and listener."

2005 Best of Don Alder:
"Don Alder compiles a dozen gems from his collection that's as pleasant as it's impressive. Based in Vancouver, British Columbia, Alder intertwines his fingerpicking with percussion on his soundboard for a smooth but surprisingly propulsive effect. This solo, acoustic, instrumental disc features Alden's own compositions, which are invariably marked by their expressiveness. They range from the galloping Western of "Nutberry Farm" to the bittersweet "Marshall's Lanai" to the swinging "Granny on the Run." His liner notes reveal compositional tidbits, adding to the fun, and also offer a glimpse into the huge heart of this versatile musician."  Fred Kraus

2003 Acoustiholic:
"Most artists who arrive on the scene with acoustic guitar-in-hand proclaim themselves as either fingerstylists or singer-songwriters, but hardly ever both. Don Alder is an artist able to wear both hats quite comfortably. The former Winfield competitor and student of Don Ross can kick up his heels instrumentally (as on "Granny on the Run") but can also put his vocals and songwriting up on ear-catching display ("Haunting Me")."  Alan Fark

Media feedback 
Penticton Herald: "Don Alder, the King of Strings."

Vancouver Magazine: "Don Alder is widely acclaimed as one of the finest acoustic guitarists in the world."

Guitar Player Magazine: "He hasn’t stopped blowing minds" 

"In einer sehr melodiösen Klangsprache entfaltet der Meister der Gitarre einen Song ohne Worte, ein musikalisches Zwiegespräch zwischen zwei "Stimmen" seiner Gitarre." (WAZ Herne, 12/2016 - With his very melodic sound language the guitar virtuoso creates a song without words, a dialogue between two "voices" of his guitar.)

"Diese scheinbare Leichtigkeit bei gleichzeitig hochkarätiger Qualität und atemberaubender Geschwindigkeit, das ist die eigentliche Kunst." (RP Neuss, 04/2016 - Making it look simple but deliver high quality with breathtaking speed - that's his artistry.)

"Don Alder ist nicht nur Gitarrist, sondern auch Sänger. Seine Songs sind auch deswegen abwechslungsreich, weil er sie zum Teil auf einer Harfengitarre spielt, die Alders Klangspektrum noch einmal erweitert." (NOZ, 09/2017) - Don Alder is not only a guitarist, but also a singer/songwriter. He's offering a big variety of songs by using different types of guitars, f.e. his harp guitar, which offers a wider sound spectrum than a normal acoustic guitar.

"Der Kanadier ist der international mit den meisten Titeln ausgezeichnete Gitarrist und manchmal denkt man, es würde nicht nur ein Gitarrenspieler auf der Bühne stehen." (Leverkusen, 11/2017) - The Canadian is an international successful guitarist who won several awards, and sometimes his music sounds like there is not only guitarist on stage.

Sources 

GuitarIdol
Guitarplayer Superstar 2010 
Man in Motion Tour
Williams Lake CivicWeb

Int'l Fingerstyle Champion
Brand Laureate Award
Williams Lake Tribune 2015-08-28 
IMDB.com
Man-In-Motion-World-Tour
Rick: The Rick Hansen Story
VAMS
Iguitar magazine
Guitarplayer.com 
Greenfield Guitars

sixstringbliss.com
Iguitar magazine
CBC
UBC
DAREarts
Extreme Guitar Duo
Akustik-Gitarre 02/2009 p.72

 

wiki

Other Links 

Don Alder's website: http://www.donalder.com
Facebook: https://www.facebook.com/donalderfanpage
Twitter: https://www.twitter.com/donalder
Instagram: https://www.instagram.com/don_alder
Spotify: https://open.spotify.com/artist/6t0rRDIN8ajaJ3RmNOlDfu
Soundcloud: https://soundcloud.com/don-alder/sets/armed-dangerous
EPK: http://epk.donalder.com

Living people
Canadian guitarists
Fingerstyle guitarists
Musicians from Vancouver
Year of birth missing (living people)